Janakinagar may refer to:

Janakinagar, Sagarmatha, Nepal
Janakinagar, Sarlahi, Nepal
Janakinagar, Seti, Nepal